Tuaina Taii Tualima (born 1 June 1997 in Auckland, NZ) is an Australian rugby union player who plays for the Queensland Reds in Super Rugby. His playing position is lock or flanker. He has signed to the Reds wider development squad for the 2020 season.

Super Rugby statistics

Reference list

External links
Rugby.com.au profile
itsrugby.co.uk profile

1997 births
Australian rugby union players
Australian sportspeople of Samoan descent
Living people
Rugby union locks
Rugby union flankers
Queensland Reds players
Brisbane City (rugby union) players
Rugby union players from Auckland
Melbourne Rebels players